Nina Alexeevna Zhuk (nee: Bakusheva) (born 9 July 1934 in Savino, Yaroslavl Oblast) is a retired pair skater who represented the Soviet Union in competition. With her husband Stanislav Zhuk, she is the 1958-1960 European silver medalist. They placed 6th at the 1960 Winter Olympics.

Competitive highlights
(with Zhuk)

References

 
 Sports-reference profile

Navigation

1934 births
Living people
People from Yaroslavl Oblast
Russian female pair skaters
Soviet female pair skaters
Olympic figure skaters of the Soviet Union
Figure skaters at the 1960 Winter Olympics
European Figure Skating Championships medalists
Soviet figure skating coaches
Female sports coaches
Sportspeople from Yaroslavl Oblast